Yu Yaodong (1951–2012) was a badminton player from People's Republic of China.

Career 
Yu Yaodong was born in 1951 in Dongguan, Guangdong. He entered the Guangzhou Amateur Sports School in 1961 then entered the Guangdong team in 1965 and was finally selected for the national team in 1972. At the second ever Badminton World Championships (first by World Badminton Federation) held in Thailand in 1978, Yaodong defeated his teammate Han Jian in the men's singles final and became the first ever badminton world champion in Chinese history. Later, he along with Hou Jiachang won the title of men's doubles World Champion as well. On the day of the final, Deng Xiaoping came to the scene to watch the game and presented the award to Yu Yaodong. After retiring, Yu Yaodong served as the coach of the Guangdong Province badminton team, cultivating famous badminton players such as Xie Xingfang, Zhang Jiewen and Fu Haifeng.

Achievements

World Championships

Asian Games

Invitational tournament

References 

 

1951 births
2012 deaths
Chinese male badminton players
Badminton players from Guangdong
Asian Games medalists in badminton
Asian Games gold medalists for China
Asian Games silver medalists for China
Asian Games bronze medalists for China
Badminton players at the 1974 Asian Games
Badminton players at the 1978 Asian Games
Medalists at the 1974 Asian Games
Medalists at the 1978 Asian Games